XHLEO-FM is a radio station on 105.1 FM in León, Guanajuato. It is owned by Promomedios and carries a ranchera format known as La Rancherita.

History
XELEO-AM 1110 received its concession on August 22, 1962. It was approved for migration to FM in 2011.

References

Spanish-language radio stations
Radio stations in Guanajuato